Wynton Kelly was a jazz pianist. His appearances on record date from 1948 to 1970 and include more than a dozen albums under his own name and more than 120 as a sideman.

Discography

As leader/co-leader

As sideman

Albums

Singles

Sources:

References

Jazz discographies
Discographies of American artists